is a single by Japanese pop singer Miho Komatsu released under Giza studio label. It was released 19 March 2003. The single reached #30 in its first week and sold 5,832 copies. It is charted for 3 weeks and sold 7,530 copies in total.

Track listing
All songs are written and composed by Miho Komatsu

arrangement: Satoru Kobayashi
the song was used as an opening song for NTV show AX Music T.V

arrangement: Yoshinobu Ohga
 (instrumental)
 (instrumental)

References 

Miho Komatsu songs
2003 songs
2003 singles
Songs written by Miho Komatsu
Giza Studio singles
Being Inc. singles
Song recordings produced by Daiko Nagato